Hanged Man's Farm (French: La ferme du pendu) is a 1945 French drama film directed by Jean Dréville and starring Charles Vanel and Bourvil.

It had admissions in France of 2,703,664, making it one of the most popular films of the year.

References

External links
Hanged Man's Farm at IMDb

1945 films
1940s French-language films
1945 drama films
French drama films
Films directed by Jean Dréville
French black-and-white films
1940s French films